The Presbyterian Church in Basking Ridge is a historic church at 1 E. Oak Street in the Basking Ridge section of Bernards Township in Somerset County, New Jersey, United States. The church congregation was founded in 1717. The present church, which was constructed in 1839 in a Greek Revival style, is listed in the U.S. National Register of Historic Places. Until 2017, the churchyard held the Old Oak Tree of Basking Ridge, which was estimated to be 600 years old.

Old Oak Tree

In the historical graveyard of the church stood a white oak, sometimes called the "Holy Oak", until 2017. It was 619 years old, possibly the oldest white oak in the world.

English evangelist George Whitfield and American clergyman James Davenport, preached under the tree on November 5, 1740 to a crowd of 3,000, in the First Great Awakening. George Washington's troops were drilled on the village green, within view, and Washington picnicked under the tree with the Marquis de LaFayette. The 5,500 French troops of Jean-Baptiste Donatien de Vimeur, comte de Rochambeau marched by in 1781, on their route to Yorktown, Virginia and the decisive battle of the American Revolutionary War.

In June 2016, the tree was "failing to thrive" and showed signs of distress as its upper parts failed to sprout leaves. By September 2016, the tree had died. The tree was taken down over three days with the work finished on April 26, 2017. A young white oak grown from an acorn of the old tree has been planted in the churchyard.

The new biggest tree in New Jersey is identified as another white oak tree in the yard of the Sparta Historical Association of Sparta, New Jersey.

Building

As of 1974, much of the glass seemed to be original.

The Historic American Buildings Survey inventoried the church in 1939.It was added to the National Register of Historic Places in 1974.

See also
List of historic sites preserved along Rochambeau's route
Arbutus Oak
Church Website

References

Historic places on the Washington–Rochambeau Revolutionary Route
Presbyterian churches in New Jersey
Churches on the National Register of Historic Places in New Jersey
Churches completed in 1839
19th-century Presbyterian church buildings in the United States
Churches in Somerset County, New Jersey
National Register of Historic Places in Somerset County, New Jersey
New Jersey Register of Historic Places
Bernards Township, New Jersey
1839 establishments in New Jersey